Rich Music is an independent record label founded by entrepreneur Richard Mendez and his son, Joshua Mendez, in 2007.

In February 2017, the label signed a distribution deal with Sony Music's Latin division. In April of the same year, Rich Music was nominated Latin Label of the Year at the Latin Billboard Awards.

Currently, artists signed to the label include Justin Quiles, Sech, Dalex, Dimelo Flow (formerly known as DJ Flow), and Magnifico "The Beat Monsta"

References 

Independent record labels